Halomeniinae is a subfamily of cavibelonian solenogasters, shell-less, worm-like mollusks.

Halomenia is the only genus in this subfamily.

References

Cavibelonia